James Alfred Fletcher (10 November 1931 - 22 November 2020) was an English former footballer of the 1950s and 1960s, who played professionally for Gillingham and as a semi-professional for various clubs in Kent. After retiring from football he became a successful breeder of racing greyhounds.

Football career
Born in the village of Wouldham in Kent, Fletcher began his career with the local team before joining Chatham Town of the Kent League. He subsequently played for other Kent-based non-league clubs Faversham Town and Maidstone United, where he was a leading goalscorer in the Corinthian League and was twice chosen to play for the England national amateur team.

In 1957 he turned professional with Gillingham of the Football League Third Division South and made his debut in the first game of the 1957–58 season, partnering Ron Saunders in attack. He failed to gain a regular place in the Gills' first team and left the club at the end of the season to join Southend United.  He spent six months at Roots Hall but never played for the club's first team.  In January 1959 he returned to the non-league scene, joining Gravesend & Northfleet of the Southern Football League, and later played for Dartford, Margate and Dover.

Post-football career
After retiring from football in 1964, Fletcher became a successful breeder of racing greyhounds and went on to win large amounts of money betting on his dogs. His greatest success came in 1991, when his consortium won £200,000 on a high-profile race at Wimbledon Stadium.  In 2001, he lived in Sutton Valence near Maidstone and still regularly attended greyhound races.

References

1931 births
2020 deaths
English footballers
England amateur international footballers
Gillingham F.C. players
Southend United F.C. players
Ebbsfleet United F.C. players
Margate F.C. players
Faversham Town F.C. players
Maidstone United F.C. (1897) players
Dartford F.C. players
Chatham Town F.C. players
Dover F.C. players
English Football League players
Association football inside forwards
People from Sutton Valence
People from Wouldham